Meling is a surname. Notable people with the surname include:

Andreas Meling (1839–1928), Norwegian ship owner and politician
Birger Meling (born 1994), Norwegian footballer
Brynjar Meling (born 1967), Norwegian lawyer
Gerhard Meling (1892–1955), Norwegian track and field athlete
Lars Olai Meling (1876–1951), Norwegian politician
Siri A. Meling (born 1963), Norwegian politician

See also
Melling (disambiguation)